In enzymology, a lipopolysaccharide glucosyltransferase I is an enzyme that catalyzes the chemical reaction

UDP-glucose + lipopolysaccharide  UDP + D-glucosyl-lipopolysaccharide

Thus, the two substrates of this enzyme are UDP-glucose and lipopolysaccharide, whereas its two products are UDP and D-glucosyl-lipopolysaccharide.

This enzyme belongs to the family of glycosyltransferases, specifically the hexosyltransferases.  The systematic name of this enzyme class is UDP-glucose:lipopolysaccharide glucosyltransferase. Other names in common use include UDP-glucose:lipopolysaccharide glucosyltransferase I, lipopolysaccharide glucosyltransferase, uridine diphosphate glucose:lipopolysaccharide glucosyltransferase, I, and uridine diphosphoglucose-lipopolysaccharide glucosyltransferase.  This enzyme participates in lipopolysaccharide biosynthesis and glycan structures - biosynthesis 2.

References

 
 

EC 2.4.1
Enzymes of unknown structure